Iddi-ilum, also Iddi-El or Iddin-El (i-ti-ilum, ruled 2090-2085 BCE), was a military governor, or Shakkanakku, of the ancient city-state of Mari in eastern Syria, following the conquest, the destruction and the control of the city by the Akkadian Empire. 

Iddi-ilum was contemporary of the Third Dynasty of Ur, and probably their vassal.

His headless statue, the Statue of Iddi-Ilum was discovered at the Royal Palace of Mari during excavations directed by French archaeologist André Parrot. The statue was made of soapstone and bears an inscription identifying the figure and dedicating it to the goddess Ishtar or Inanna. The statue is now displayed at the Musée du Louvre in Paris. 

The inscription on the statue reads:

Statue of Iddi-ilum

References

21st-century BC rulers
Kings of Mari
21st-century BC people